Mirlande Manigat (born Mirlande Hyppolite in Miragoâne, on November 3, 1940) is a Haitian constitutional law professor and candidate in the 2010 presidential election. She is the widow of former president Leslie Manigat and briefly served as First Lady of Haiti in 1988.

2010 presidential election

Mirlande Manigat was the presidential candidate for the Rally of Progressive National Democrats (RDNP) centre-right party. On October 18, 2010, Dr. Manigat also received the endorsement of the Collectif pour le Renouveau Haïtien (COREH).

Her platform for the presidency included a focus on education of the youth of Haiti, and lifting the long-standing and restrictive constitutional conditions on dual nationality. She specifically promoted opening government positions for members of the Haitian diaspora. Manigat also aimed for a more independent Haitian state, one less reliant upon and subject to foreign governments and NGOs.

Like 2010 presidential candidate Michel Martelly, Manigat initially called for November 28, 2010 presidential votes to be canceled given the widespread allegations of fraud in the first round, but backtracked after reports surfaced that she had polled well.

References

External links 
 Dossier Élections en Haïti 
Biography of Mirlande Manigat, National Progressive Democrats of Haiti

Collected news at AOL News
The Woman Who Would Be Haiti's Next President, Tim Padgett and Jessica Desvarieux, ''Time, November 15, 2010

Living people
1940 births
First ladies and gentlemen of Haiti
Rally of Progressive National Democrats politicians
People from Miragoâne
Candidates for President of Haiti
Haitian people of Mulatto descent